Fred Glover may refer to:
Fred Glover (ice hockey), Canadian NHL player and coach.
Fred W. Glover, computer scientist, inventor of tabu search and of the term  "meta-heuristic"